is a Japanese footballer.

Club statistics
Updated to 23 February 2016.

References

External links

Profile at Kataller Toyama

1987 births
Living people
Osaka Gakuin University alumni
Association football people from Hyōgo Prefecture
Japanese footballers
J2 League players
J3 League players
Kataller Toyama players
FC Machida Zelvia players
Association football defenders